Chloromyxum is a genus of parasitic, myxosporean cnidarians belonging to the family Chloromyxidae.

The species of this genus are found in Northern America and Australia.

Species:

Chloromyxum argusi 
Chloromyxum atlantoraji 
Chloromyxum caudatum

References

Chloromyxidae
Cnidarian genera